Björn Michaelsen is the Deputy Chairman at The Document Foundation, the legal entity behind LibreOffice.

Research work 
Björn Michaelsen studied physics at the University of Hamburg and worked in the area of arms control and peace studies at the Institute for Peace Research and Security Policy in Hamburg, published his results there before becoming involved in open source and software development.

Software engineering and executive work 
Björn Michaelsen is currently employed by freiheit.com, a German software company. Previously he was working for Canonical Ltd. where he was responsible for the packaging and development of LibreOffice for Ubuntu and was welcomed as someone having "a deep expertise on the LibreOffice core".
Coming from
Oracle (and before that Sun), where he was working on OpenOffice.org for a few years in the Writer/Framework area, he was later the first to tackle the 20-year old OpenOffice build system, with a portable GNU make-based approach, focusing on build speed.

Michaelsen joined LibreOffice in 2011 and became an appointed member of the Engineering Steering Committee from the beginning, was in the initial set of certified LibreOffice developers and championed multiple initiatives of the LibreOffice project, including the migration to a new improved build system. 
He is a member of the Board of Directors of The Document Foundation, and speaks frequently at open source events. He also created multiple LibreOffice extensions to showcase the power and simplicity of these.

References

People in information technology
Free software programmers
Living people
Sun Microsystems people
Computer programmers
German computer programmers
LibreOffice
Year of birth missing (living people)